Cypripedium reginae, known as the showy lady's slipper, pink-and-white lady's-slipper, or the queen's lady's-slipper, is a rare lady's-slipper orchid native to northern North America. Although never common, this plant has vanished from much of its historical range due to habitat loss. It is the state flower of Minnesota.

Etymology
The species name reginae is Latin for "of a queen". Common names also include fairy queen, white wing moccasin, royal lady's slipper, and silver-slipper.

Description
Like other lady's slipper orchids (subfamily Cypripedioideae) the Cypripedium reginae has flowers with a pouch-shaped labellum. Cypripedium reginae is a large, terrestrial orchid, growing  in height with many stems from the same rootstock. Each stem has three to five alternate, pubescent leaves. Flowering stems one to three large, white and pink flowers. The pouch-shaped labellum is rose-pink to magenta  in length.

Despite producing a large amount of seeds per seed pod, it reproduces largely by vegetative reproduction.

Habitat

Cypripedium reginae grows in wetlands such as fens, wooded swamps, and riverbanks. Cyp. reginae thrives in neutral to basic soils but can be found in slightly acidic conditions. The plants often form in clumps by branching of the underground rhizomes. Its roots are typically within a few inches of the top of the soil. It prefers very loose soils and when growing in fens it will most often be found in mossy hummocks.

It can tolerate full sun but prefers partial shade for some part of the day. When exposed to full sun, the flower lip is somewhat bleached and less deeply colored. It is occasionally eaten by white-tailed deer.

Cypripedium reginae can be found in Canada from Saskatchewan east to Atlantic Canada, and the United States from North Dakota east to the Atlantic and south to Arkansas and Tennessee.

Reproduction
Cypripedium reginae reproduces sexually and depends on insects such as syrphid flies, beetles and Megachile bees for pollination. The structure of the flower creates a tight space through which insects have to squeeze. A pollinating insect first passes by the stigma, and upon exiting the trap rubs against the anther. Pollination typically occurs in June and the seed pod or fruit is ripe by September and dehisces by October. Although a single seed pod can produce over 50,000 seeds, low germination and a seed-to-flowering term of about 8 years indicate that sexual reproduction is inefficient. Asexual reproduction from rhizomes is a common means of sustaining a population.

It flowers in early to midsummer, usually with 1 to 2 flowers per stalk, less commonly 3 or 4.

Conservation
Cypripedium reginae is quite rare. Its increasing rarity is attributable to destruction of a suitable alkaline habitat;  it is sensitive to hydrologic disturbances, and is threatened by wetland draining, water contamination, habitat destruction and horticultural collectors. Browsing by an exploding deer population stunts or eliminates the plant's growth.

The plant is classified as imperiled (SRANK S2) or critically imperiled (S1) in Arkansas, Connecticut, Illinois, Iowa, Missouri, New Brunswick, New Hampshire, New Jersey, Newfoundland and Labrador, North Dakota, Nova Scotia, Ohio, Pennsylvania, Prince Edward Island, Saskatchewan, Tennessee, Virginia and West Virginia. It is considered vulnerable (S3) in Indiana, Maine, Manitoba, Massachusetts, New York, Quebec, Vermont, Wisconsin, Rhode Island, and several areas of eastern Canada. It is known to occur in only 14 locations in Massachusetts (as of 2016).  It was historically found in Kentucky and North Carolina, but has not been found recently.

The only provinces to rank Cyp. reginae as apparently secure (S4) are Ontario and Manitoba.  There are no SRANKs for the U.S. states of Minnesota and Michigan, but the plant is found in 61 of Michigan's 83 counties, and 33 of the 87 counties in Minnesota.

The New Hampshire Academy of Science has sponsored research regarding the conservation and analysis of Cyp. species native to northern New England. They have published research papers and numerous abstracts and presented their research in the annual meeting notes of the AAAS on Cyp. species found in VT and NH.

Cultivation
The showy lady's slipper has been a subject of horticultural interest for many years, and was known to Charles Darwin who, like many, was unsuccessful in cultivating the plant.

It has low seed germination rates and slow maturation to flowering. This makes it more vulnerable to illegal collection. It is difficult to raise from seed, taking many months to germinate in sterile culture.  In the 1990s a group of high school students in New Hampshire made progress on axenic culture from seed and were able to obtain over 50% germination levels in about 3 weeks. Efforts at micropropagation have had marginal success.

Cultural significance

The plant became the state flower of Minnesota in 1902 and was protected by state law in 1925. It is illegal to pick or uproot a showy lady's slipper flower in Minnesota.

Although this plant was chosen as the provincial flower for Prince Edward Island in 1947, it is so rare on the island that another lady's-slipper, C. acaule (moccasin flower or pink lady's slipper), replaced it as the province's floral emblem in 1965.

Chemistry
Cypripedium reginae contains an irritant, cypripedin, a phenanthrenequinone. The plant is known to cause dermatitis on the hands and face. The first report of the allergy reaction was in 1875 by H. H. Babcock in the United States, 35 years before the term "allergy" was coined. The allergen was later isolated in West Germany by Bjorn M. Hausen and associates.

Medicine
The Cypripedium species have been used in native remedies for dermatitis, tooth aches, anxiety, headaches, as an antispasmodic, stimulant and sedative, but the preferred species for these uses are Cypripedium parviflorum and Cypripedium acaule, used as topical applications or tea.

Dangers
The foliage hairs may cause a rash similar to the one caused by poison ivy.

References

Other sources
 Gray's Manual of Botany of the Northern United States, American Book Company, 1889.

External links

 

reginae
Orchids of North America
Plants described in 1788
Medicinal plants of North America
Symbols of Minnesota
Terrestrial orchids